The 2019 Kwai Tsing District Council election was held on 24 November 2019 to elect all 31 elected members to the 32-member Kwai Tsing District Council.

The pro-democrats scored a landslide victory in the 2019 election and regained the control of the council by taking 27 of the 31 elected seats. Notable defeated incumbent included legislator Alice Mak of FTU in Wai Ying.

Overall election results
Before election:

Change in composition:

References

External links
 Election Results - Overall Results

2019 Hong Kong local elections